Mount Silam is a mountain in Lahad Datu District, Sabah, Malaysia.

Description
The geology is characterised by ultrabasic rock. Rainforest covers the mountain from  altitude to the summit.

Flora
Mount Silam is home to the endangered tree Madhuca silamensis. It is also home to a number of pitcher plant species including Nepenthes macrovulgaris and Nepenthes tentaculata.

Tourism
The Tower of Heaven is a  observation tower that was built as a tourist facility at the top of Mount Silam in 2012. The tower has panoramic views that include the Darvel Bay islands. The complex includes nature trails and tourist accommodation.

References

External links
 Climbing Mt. Silam with Sabah Crabs

Lahad Datu District
Silam